A.C. Milan was a reliable force just under the top teams in Serie A, finishing in fifth position. It had the ability to win matches without impressing, having a goal difference of just +6, despite finishing in 5th place. The position was just enough to clinch a UEFA Cup spot, despite losing the Coppa Italia final to Sampdoria.

Squad

Goalkeepers
  Giulio Nuciari
  Giuliano Terraneo
  Bill Lonergan

Defenders
  Franco Baresi
  Fabio Casiraghi
  Catello Cimmino
  Filippo Galli
  Paolo Maldini
  Luigi Russo
  Mauro Tassotti

Midfielders
  Sergio Battistini
  Gabriello Carotti
  Agostino Di Bartolomei
  Alberigo Evani
  Salvatore Giunta
  Andrea Icardi
  Andrea Manzo
  Roberto Scarnecchia
  Vinicio Verza
  Ray Wilkins

Attackers
  Pietro Paolo Virdis
  Mark Hateley
  Giuseppe Incocciati

Competitions

Serie A

League table

Matches

Topscorers
  Pietro Paolo Virdis 9
  Mark Hateley 7
  Agostino Di Bartolomei 6
  Sergio Battistini 5

Coppa Italia

First Round 

Eightfinals

Quarterfinals

Semifinals

Final

References

Sources
   RSSSF - Italy 1984/85

A.C. Milan seasons
Milan